On 24 November 2015, a bus carrying Tunisian presidential guards exploded, killing 12, on a principal road in Tunis, Tunisia. ISIL claimed responsibility for the attack. The bomber, who also died in the attack, was identified as Houssem Abdelli.

Bombing
On 24 November 2015, at least 12 people were killed in a bus bombing in Tunis, the capital of Tunisia. The bus was carrying members of the Tunisian Presidential Security guard. The blast happened when the vehicle was parked near a main artery in the Tunisian capital where guard members are typically picked up and dropped off, according to an official in the Tunisian Prime Minister's office.

The explosion, described as an "attack" by presidential spokesman Moez Sinaoui, struck on the capital's Mohamed V Avenue, a ministry official told AFP. An AFP journalist reported seeing the partly burnt out shell of the bus, with police, ambulances, and fire trucks at the scene.

The bomber was identified as Houssem Abdelli, a 28-year-old resident of Tunis. The man's mother identified him from a photograph.

Response
The Tunisian Interior Ministry announced that this was an act of terrorism, using a Semtex explosive traced to Libya. The Islamic State of Iraq and the Levant militant group claimed responsibility for the attack in an online statement, though authorities did not discuss any ties between the bomber and extremist groups.

The group has also claimed responsibility for two attacks in Tunisia earlier in the year, targeting the tourism industry: the Bardo museum attack in March and an attack on a beach resort in Sousse in June.

After the attack, President Beji Caid Essebsi placed Tunis under curfew and resumed a month-long state of emergency. The Tunisian Interior Ministry reported that national security raids had led to the arrest of 40 people with suspected ties to terrorist groups. Among the people arrested were the suspected bomber's sister and mother. The Tunisian government's Security Council shut down Facebook accounts and websites linked to terrorist groups.

See also 

 2014 Chaambi Mountains attack
 2015 Sousse attacks
 Bardo National Museum attack
 Ghriba synagogue bombing

References

2015 murders in Tunisia
2015 bombing
Arab Winter in Tunisia
Bus bombings in Africa
Explosions in 2015
Explosions in Tunisia
ISIL terrorist incidents in Tunisia
Islamic terrorist incidents in 2015
Mass murder in 2015
Mass murder in Tunisia
2015 bombing
November 2015 crimes in Africa
November 2015 events in Africa
Suicide bombings in Africa
Terrorist incidents in Tunisia in 2015
2015 bombing
2015 disasters in Tunisia